The BW Open is a professional tennis tournament played on indoor hard courts. It is currently part of the Association of Tennis Professionals (ATP) Challenger Tour. It was first held in Ottignies-Louvain-la-Neuve, Belgium in 2023.

Past finals

Singles

Doubles

References

ATP Challenger Tour
Hard court tennis tournaments
Tennis tournaments in Belgium
Recurring sporting events established in 2023